Bendt Rothe (9 May 1921 – 31 December 1989) was a Danish actor who played the role of the rejected husband Gustav Kanning in Gertrud, the 1964 film by Carl Theodor Dreyer.

Partial filmography 

 De tre skolekammerater (1944) - Forsvarsadvokat
 Det bødes der for (1944) - Eigil Asgaard
 Drømmen om i morgen (1945)
 Diskret Ophold (1946) - Thorsten Olesen
 Fra den gamle Købmandsgaard (1951) - Erling
 Vi arme syndere (1952) - Maler Astrup
 Avismanden (1952) - Lægen
 Hejrenæs (1953) - Fabrikant Helge Knudsen
 Adam and Eve (1953) - Advokat
 Karen, Maren og Mette (1954) - Auktionarius
 Min datter Nelly (1955) - Tandlæge Bent Holm
 Bundfald (1957) - Kriminalassistenten
 Pigen i søgelyset (1959) - Chefredaktør
 Gymnasiepigen (1960) - Rektor Engskjold
 Komtessen (1961) - Højesteretssagfører Skotterup
 Ullabella (1961) - Viceskoledirektør
 Eventyr på Mallorca (1961) - Rejseleder Anders Kristensen
 The Counterfeit Traitor (1962) - Mögens (uncredited)
 Rikki og mændene (1962) - Knud
 Premiere i helvede (1964) - Doktor Gregersen
 Fem mand og Rosa (1964) - Philip André
 Gertrud (1964) - Gustav Kanning
 Don Olsen kommer til byen (1964) - Bankdirektør, Ben W.
 Nu stiger den (1966) - Greve Rosen
 Søskende (1966) - Arthur
 Historien om Barbara (1967)
 I Belong to Me (1967) - Dommeren
 Smukke-Arne og Rosa (1967) - Bankdirektør Schäfer
 Doctor Glas (1968) - Birck
 De røde heste (1968) - Dommer
 The Only Way (1970) - Sanders
 19 Red Roses (1974) - Janus Bech
 Kassen stemmer (1976) - Bankdirektør
 Strømer (1976) - Mester
 Hærværk (1977) - H.C. Stefani
 The Heritage (1978) - Herredsfoged
 The Olsen Gang Long Gone (1981) - Fransk overtjener
 Babette's Feast (1987) - Old Nielsen

References

External links

Danish male actors
1921 births
1989 deaths
Male actors from Copenhagen
20th-century Danish male actors
Burials at Mariebjerg Cemetery